Amir Abdou (born 8 July 1972) is a French Comorian professional football manager. Who is coaching currently Mauritania national football team.

Career
In 2012, Abdou began his coaching career in the French club Golfech. From 13 January 2014 he coached Comoros national team. He signed a new contract in January 2019. Abdou spent eight years in charge of Comoros and led them to their first ever Nations Cup finals in Cameroon.

On 3 March 2022, he joined the Mauritania national team.

References

External links
 
 
 Amir Abdou Interview

1972 births
Living people
Sportspeople from Marseille
French football managers
Comorian football managers
Comoros national football team managers
French sportspeople of Comorian descent
Comorian expatriate football managers
Mauritania national football team managers
French expatriate football managers
French expatriate sportspeople in Mauritania
Comorian expatriate sportspeople in Mauritania
Expatriate football managers in Mauritania